Paul Anthony Ronan (born 21 March 1965) is an Irish actor.

Career 
In 1995, Ronan's acting career started. Ronan has been a regular performer in TV and films since the mid-'90s, notably as Edso Dowling in the Ballykissangel TV series; other TV appearances include Rebel Heart and The Tudors.

Personal life 
In 1992, Paul Anthony Ronan married Monica Brennan.

They have one daughter, Saoirse Ronan, who is an actress.

Filmography

Film

Television

References

External links
 

1965 births
20th-century Irish people
21st-century Irish people
Irish male film actors
Irish male television actors
Male actors from Manchester
Living people